Helong (alternate names Helon, Kupang and Semau) is a Central Malayo-Polynesian language of West Timor. Speakers are interspersed with those of Amarasi. This language has become endangered as a result of its native speakers marrying those who do not speak Helong, and as a result of coming in contact with the outside community. Helong speakers are found in four villages on the South-Western coast of West Timor, as well as on Semau Island, a small island just off the coast of West Timor. The mostly Christian, slightly patriarchal society of Semau do their best to send their children away to Bali (or elsewhere) to earn money to send home.

Classification 
Helong is an Austronesian language and belongs to its Malayo-Polynesian branch. The Endangered Languages Project has classified Helong as "vulnerable", based on the most recent data from 1997. The largest threat to Helong is a dialect of Malay spoken in Kupang, called Kupang Malay, as the native Helong speakers often visit Kupang, and use that dialect when there.

History 
Helong was once the primary language spoken in Kupang, but the language has since fallen out of popularity, and is now used sparsely around Kupang, but mostly used on Semau Island just off the coast of Kupang. In recent years, the people in Kupang have spoken a local dialect of Malay, resulting in Helong being largely forgotten by those who visit the capital city often. While the new language has left behind a lot of the region's history, experts believe that Helong speakers contain a vast wealth of knowledge around the past, specifically, the spreading of Atoni culture when the Dutch gave them weapons, which wiped out many of the other cultures that existed in West Timor, but leaving Helong traditions and culture widely intact.

Grammar

Morphology 
Helong word structure follows a standard C(C)V(C)V(C) (where (C) indicates that a consonant can appear here but does not have to) word structure. Additionally, there is always a consonant at the beginning of every non-clitic word. Ignoring suffixes, the last consonant in any word can only be a few things, the glottal or apical consonants found in the table in the Phonology section, with the exception of the letter d, which does not satisfy this rule. On the contrary, there are no such limits on the last vowel of a word, which can be any of the five.

Syntax 
Helong follows a VSO word order like the other languages closely related to it. Helong is similar to languages like Spanish when it comes to noun-adjective order. The noun will come before the adjective describing it in a sentence. For example,  directly translates as 'child first', but refers to somebody's first child. However, unlike in Spanish, punctuation will only come at the end of a sentence. Like most languages, the first word of each sentence, as well as proper nouns are capitalized. Helong uses negative modifiers to change the meaning of a sentence to the opposite. For example, "... " means 'do not believe', with  meaning 'believe', and  being a negative modifier.

Writing system 
Helong uses the same Latin script used in the majority of languages around the world. While Helong does not use the full 26-character ISO basic Latin alphabet, but contains 27 characters total, which can be seen in the Phonology section below. While most of Helong words are written in the same format as English words, one key difference is that when using modifiers such as plurals, distributive numerals, and frequencies, Helong uses Hyphens or Tildes to connect the base word to the modifier.

For example, in the sentence "",  means lay, so  would refer to laying multiple things, as the -s indicates plurality.  is the number 'two', so  would translate to the English 'pair'.

Phonology 
Helong has five vowels: . These vowels are identical to those in the English language, including the pronunciation. 

The palatal stops  and the voiced labio-velar approximant  are marginal phonemes, only occurring in a few loanwords.

Numbers 

The Helong language uses words for each base unit (i.e. tens, hundreds, thousands).  For example, the number 27 could be said as "tens two ones seven", indicating a 2 in the tens column and a 7 in the ones column.

Ordinal numbers, with the exception of the word for first, simply add  in front of the word for the number. Researchers have been unable to determine if  is its own word, a prefix, or a proclitic.

Non-numeric quantity 

 is a Helong idiom that translates directly as 'cockatoos eating seeds', which they use as a saying to describe way too many of a specific item.

Examples 
The following are example sentences of Helong:

References

External links
Helong Bible
Documentation of three dialects of Helong: an endangered language of eastern Indonesia
Helong Project
Helong video resources on YouTube

Timor–Babar languages
Languages of Indonesia